Ask Rhod Gilbert is a British comedy panel show produced by Green Inc for the BBC. It began on 27 September 2010 and ended on 9 November 2011 on BBC One, it is presented by Rhod Gilbert with Greg Davies and Lloyd Langford as regular panelists.

Overview
In each episode questions are asked by well-known personalities (many of these questions are set-ups for jokes) and members of the public, the host and his guests attempt to find the answers through studio demonstrations, experiments, archive clips, internet distractions, live phone calls and visual link-ups from home and around the world.

The second series became more structured than the first, with four rounds making up each show. The first round, "A Famous Face Asks", begins with a video clip from a famous personality or personalities, with questions asked in each one. The second round, "The World Asks", involves a video-recorded question from a person around the globe, while the third round, "The Audience Asks", is a quickfire round with questions from the audience. The fourth round, "Our Special Guest Asks", involves a question from one of the panellists, and also involves a section entitled "Let's Go To The Lab", where either one or two of the show's 'regulars', Greg Davies, Lloyd Langford and Rhod Gilbert direct a studio demonstration, usually involving one (or two) of the remaining 'regulars' partaking in an "experiment" to help answering the question in that round, with the "experiment" usually involving some form of gunging or minor humiliation of those involved.

Production
A pilot of the show was recorded on 22 March 2010 at the BBC Television Centre but has not been broadcast. Recording of the first series began in September 2010 and ended in November 2010. Three episodes of the first series were recorded at BBC Television Centre, another two were recorded at the BBC Blackstaff Studio, Belfast and the rest of the episodes were recorded at BBC Pacific Quay.

In 2013 Rhod Gilbert revealed that the show had been axed.

In 2021, Gilbert reflected on his own contribution to the show on the vlog Ed Venturing, stating "I think it suffered from being a big BBC1 production show ... It's obviously exciting when you get a show with your name on it... and you naively think that you're going to shape it all, and you realise that... just the number of people with a vested interest in a show like that...you realise that you're one cog of many, and you're sort of a very small cog."

Transmissions

Episode list

Series 1

Series 2

References

External links

Episode list

2010s British comedy television series
2010 British television series debuts
2011 British television series endings
BBC panel games
BBC television comedy
BBC television game shows
British panel games
2010s British game shows
English-language television shows
Television series featuring gunge